This list of animal rights groups consists of groups in the animal rights movement. Such animal rights groups work towards their ideals, which include the viewpoint that animals should have equivalent rights to humans, such as not being "used" in research, food, clothing and entertainment industries, and seek to end the status of animals as property. (Cf. Animal welfare.)

This list contains only groups, organizations and leaderless resistance networks that have articles within Wikipedia.

Organizations

General animal rights

American Society for the Prevention of Cruelty to Animals (ASPCA)
Animal Aid (UK)
Animal Defenders International
Animal Defense League
Animal Ethics
Animal Justice (Canada)
Animal Legal Defense Fund
Animal Liberation Leagues
Animal Liberation Press Office
Animal Outlook (formerly Compassion Over Killing)
Animal Protection and Rescue League
Animal Welfare Network Nepal
AnimaNaturalis (Spain and Latin America)
Animals Now
Anonymous for the Voiceless
Best Friends Animal Society
Captive Animals Protection Society
Coalition to Abolish the Fur Trade (CAFT)
Comunidad Inti Wara Yassi
Direct Action Everywhere (DxE)
Equanimal
Farm Animal Rights Movement (FARM)
Friends of Animals (FoA)
HAYTAP
Humane Society of the United States (HSUS)
In Defense of Animals (IDA)
International Primate Protection League (IPPL)
Italian Horse Protection Association (IHP)
L214
Last Chance for Animals (LCA)
Libera!
Massachusetts Animal Rights Coalition (MARC)
Mercy For Animals (MFA)
No Kill Advocacy Center (NKAC)
Nonhuman Rights Project
People for the Ethical Treatment of Animals (PETA)
People for Animals (PFA)
Save Animals From Exploitation (SAFE)
Western Animal Rights Network (WARN)
Uncaged Campaigns

Focused on animal testing

 American Anti-Vivisection Society (AAVS)
 Americans For Medical Advancement
 Animal Defenders International (see also National Anti-Vivisection Society)
 Animal Free Research UK
 Anti-Vivisection Coalition (AVC)
 Center for Alternatives to Animal Testing (CAAT)
 Cruelty Free International
 Great Ape Project
 Iranian Anti-Vivisection Association (IAVA)
 National Anti-Vivisection Society (NAVS)
 New England Anti-Vivisection Society (NEAVS)
 Physicians Committee for Responsible Medicine (PCRM)
 Primate Freedom Project
 Rocky Mountain Animal Defense
 SPEAK

Focused on bloodsports
 CAS International
 Hunt Saboteurs Association (HSA)
 League Against Cruel Sports

Focused on farmed animals
 Compassion in World Farming
 Farm Sanctuary
 L214
 Mercy for Animals
 United Poultry Concerns (UPC)
 Factory Farming Awareness Coalition

Focused on speciesism 
 Animal Ethics

Vegan or vegetarian-oriented groups
 Every Animal
 Liberation BC
 Vegan Outreach
 Vegan Society
 Vegetarian Society
 Vegetarians' International Voice for Animals (Viva!)
 Veggies Catering Campaign

Wild animals 

 Animal Ethics
 Wild Animal Initiative

Meta 
 Animal Charity Evaluators

Leaderless resistance networks

 Animal Liberation Front (ALF)
 Animal Rights Militia (ARM)
 Direct Action Everywhere (DxE)
 Justice Department (JD)
 Lobster Liberation Front (LLF)
 Oxford Arson Squad
 Revolutionary Cells - Animal Liberation Brigade (RCALB)
 Western Animal Rights Network (WARN)

Support groups
These groups, though not directly animal rights groups, predominantly operate as aboveground support functions for underground  animal rights activities or activists.
 Arkangel
 Animal Liberation Front Supporters Group (ALFSG UK)
 Animal Liberation Press Office
 Bite Back
 Earth Liberation Prisoner Support Network (ELPSN)

Defunct groups
The following entries represent groups, organizations and leaderless networks that have closed, disbanded, or ended because their goals were reached. Autonomous campaigns unclaimed by any other group may also be listed here, but not campaigns claimed by a group or leaderless network that is already on the list.

 Animal Defence and Anti-Vivisection Society
 Calf 269 (269)
 Campaign against Highgate Rabbit Farm
 Humanitarian League
 No Compromise
 Save the Shamrock Monkeys
 Stop Huntingdon Animal Cruelty (SHAC)

See also 
 Animal rights
 Animal welfare
 List of animal rights advocates
 List of animal advocacy parties
 List of animal welfare groups
 List of environmental organizations
 Veganism

References

Animal rights
Animal rights organizations
Animal rights